27th & Welton station (sometimes styled as 27th•Welton) is a RTD light rail station in the Five Points neighborhood of Denver, Colorado, United States. Originally operating as part of the D Line, the station was opened on December 19, 1995, and is operated by the Regional Transportation District. The stop was opened over a year after the rest of light rail line after support from the neighborhood. The January 14, 2018, service changes introduced the L Line, which now serves this station in place of the D Line.

References 

RTD light rail stations in Denver
Railway stations in the United States opened in 1995
Five Points, Denver